Ramna Thana is a police jurisdiction in central Dhaka. It is a historic colonial neighborhood. Once the site of Mughal gardens, it developed into an institutional area during British rule in the late 19th century. It became a focal point for Dhaka's modernization in the 1960s. It was the scene of many tumultuous events that ushered the independence of Bangladesh in 1971. The Ramna Thana falls under the jurisdiction of the Dhaka South City Corporation.

The Ramna Thana area hosts the Ramna Park (also known as Ramna Green) which is the largest park in Dhaka, seen being akin to Calcutta's Maidan, London's Hyde Park and New York's Central Park. The Suhrawardy Udyan (formerly the Ramna Race Course Maidan) is the second largest park in Dhaka. The annual parades and concerts of the Bengali New Year take place in the Ramna Thana area.

The Ramna Thana is also home of other important sites including the University of Dhaka, the Bangladesh Supreme Court, the Dhaka High Court, the Ministry of Foreign Affairs, CIRDAP, the Institution of Engineers, Bangladesh headquarter, the InterContinental Dhaka hotel, British Council Dhaka HQ, the Dhaka Club, the Bangladesh National Museum, the Bangla Academy, the International Mother Language Institute, the Dhaka Medical College, BIRDEM Hospital, the Faculty of Fine Arts, the Shaheed Minar, the official residences of the Bangladeshi ministers and official state guest houses.

Geography

Demographics
As of the 1991 Bangladesh census, the Ramna Thana had a population of 195,167. Males constituted 58.32% of the population and females 41.68%. The thana's population of those age 18 and higher was 127,049.

In popular culture
In Islamabad, Pakistan, 'Ramna' refers to the areas that fall under the G series, the name of which was borrowed from this neighborhood in Dhaka, Bangladesh. This name was given at the time East Pakistan was still a part of Pakistan and meant to acknowledge its importance to West Pakistan. The term is used for G-series sectors from G-5 (Ramna-5) upto G-17 (Ramna-17) which is last sector of this series in Islamabad. There is also the Model Police Station Ramna situated in Islamabad's G-11 sector.

See also
Upazilas of Bangladesh
Districts of Bangladesh
Divisions of Bangladesh

References

Thanas of Dhaka